Adam Anders (born October 10, 1975) is a Swedish film, television and music producer who has sold more than 100 million albums and in recent years has become one of the most in-demand Executive Producers for music-driven film and television. Anders is the CEO of Anders Media, and its record label Deep Well Records, a sub-label of Capitol Music Group.

In 2013, Adam was named No. 15 in Hollywood Reporter's Top 35 Hitmakers. Anders' work has earned him four Grammy Award nominations, and two People's Choice Awards. As the Executive Music Producer for Glee, Anders' musical productions have helped put Glee on the iTunes Top Songs chart, including original songs that he wrote, such as "Loser like Me" (landing at number one) and "Get It Right" (at number two). He also wrote an original song for Glee called Big Ass Heart, which is showcased in season 2 episode 16 of the hit 2000s show.

Glee had at one time seven of the top ten tracks on the iTunes Top Song chart including the above two original songs at one and two respectively, the cast's versions of Pink's "Raise Your Glass" at number three, The Beatles' "Blackbird" at number five, Maroon 5's "Misery" at number six, and another original song, "Hell to the No", at number eight. In May 2011, Glee had one of its biggest sales weeks to date with 986,000 downloads of tracks produced by Anders.

Anders has a track record of writing and producing music for both established artists and up-and-comers including the Jonas Brothers, Miley Cyrus, Selena Gomez, Backstreet Boys, Clay Aiken and many others. His music can also be heard on many major motion pictures and television shows including Disney's High School Musical 3, Hannah Montana, Evan Almighty and The Wedding Planner, as well as the 2012 film Rock of Ages.

Adam Anders launched Los Angeles-based record label, Deep Well Records in 2011. The first artist signed to his label was singer/songwriter/actor Shane Harper, whose self-titled debut album was released on February 14, 2012 and included the Anders-produced first single entitled, "One Step Closer".

In addition, he runs Anders Media, Inc., a production company that specializes in developing original music-driven content for major film studios and TV networks. Anders recently moved his label Deep Well Records to the Capitol Music Group, and is a consultant for Virgin Records. In October 2015, Anders co-produced "Hollow" by Tori Kelly, which was the featured single on her deluxe edition album, Unbreakable Smile. The song was co-written by several songwriters signed to the Anders-owned publishing company of the same brand, Deep Well Music Publishing. In 2016, Anders added film and TV producing credits as an executive producer for the US version of The Passion. It aired on Palm Sunday, March 20, 2016 on FOX. Anders will also executive produce the soundtrack and act as producer for ABC's remake of Dirty Dancing.

Early life

Adam Anders was born in Stockholm, Sweden. Both his parents were professional musicians, traveling and playing all over the world; often bringing their children with them wherever they went. This exposed Adam to a variety of musical and cultural differences at a very early age. Despite being classically trained Gospel performers, both his mother and father encouraged him to listen and take influences from all musical styles, from Rock 'n' Roll to Soul.

Anders formed his first band at the age of 10, together with his brother and sister and toured Europe with him playing bass. The family later moved to the US, moving around the West Coast. Due to all the traveling, Adam was homeschooled after 5th grade. Due to music being the core of his whole life, Anders became such a prominent bass player that the University of South Florida accepted him to the Jazz program at the early age of 13. They declared him a prodigy and he was allowed full credit for taking the college music classes.

After graduating at the age of 16, Anders decided to live with his brother in Nashville, Tennessee. He worked night shifts and played music during the day. After six months, he got a position as a bass player for the Christian singer-songwriter Steven Curtis Chapman, allowing him to solely focus on music as a career. After remaining on several major tours, making money to buy more studio equipment, Anders felt that songwriting and producing gave greater satisfaction and decided to transition to studio work.

Career

Early years 
Adam Anders began his professional career primarily writing and producing songs for both established artists and up-and-comers. Anders co-wrote the Backstreet Boys hit "More Than That" and Steven Curtis Chapman's "Nobody Ever." Anders then worked closely with Disney producing music for major motion pictures and television shows including Camp Rock and Camp Rock 2, Hannah Montana  and Sonny With a Chance. During this time, he collaborated with pop-singers Jesse McCartney, Clay Aiken, Nick Lachey, Ashley Tisdale, and the Jonas Brothers. In 2007 and 2008, Anders' music could be heard in Disney's High School Musical 3 and Universal's Evan Almighty.

Glee and other projects 
Glee

In 2009, Anders began producing music for FOX's hit television show Glee. Producing the popular Glee anthem "Don't Stop Believin" was the first of many contributions to the show. One year later, Anders was made Executive Music Producer for the musical comedy television show. The producer penned Glee's first two original songs, "Loser Like Me" and "Get It Right". Throughout his time on the show, he wrote a total of seven original songs and produced all sixteen of the Glee albums. Glee had at one time seven of the top ten tracks on the iTunes Top Song chart including the above two original songs at one and two respectively, the cast's versions of Pink's "Raise Your Glass" at number three, The Beatles' "Blackbird" at number five, Maroon 5's "Misery" at number six, and another original song, "Hell to the No", at number eight. In May 2011, Glee hit a sales week high with 986,000 downloads of tracks produced by Anders.

Other Projects

During his time on Glee, Anders also launched his Los Angeles-based record label, Deep Well Records. The first artist signed to his label was singer/songwriter/actor Shane Harper, whose self-titled debut album was released on February 14, 2012 and included the Anders-produced first single entitled, "One Step Closer". In 2012, Anders produced music for motion pictures including New Year's Eve and Rock of Ages, as well as producing CeeLo Green's album CeeLo's Magic Moment, writing "All I Need is Love".

2014-present
Following his time on Glee, Anders moved onto working with FX's horror television series American Horror Story. In 2015, he was a music producer for the Disney movie, Descendants. The album went #1 on iTunes and included an original song by Anders and his team.

In addition, he runs Anders Media, Inc., a production company that specializes in developing original music-driven content for major film studios and TV networks. Anders recently moved his label Deep Well Records to the Capitol Music Group, and is a consultant for Virgin Records.

In October 2015, Anders co-produced "Hollow" by Tori Kelly, which was the featured single on her deluxe edition album, Unbreakable Smile. The song was co-written by several songwriters signed to the Anders-owned publishing company of the same brand, Deep Well Music Publishing.

Film and Television Production

In 2016, Anders executive produced and arranged music for The Passion on FOX, which aired on Palm Sunday, March 20, 2016. 
In 2017, Anders produced ABC's anticipated remake of Dirty Dancing starring Abigail Breslin, in addition to executive producing its soundtrack.

Captain Underpants: The First Epic Movie

Anders worked as the Executive Song Producer and Soundtrack album Producer for DreamWorks' Captain Underpants: The First Epic Movie based on the series of children's novels of the same name by Dav Pilkey. Anders, with longtime collaborator Peer Astrom, produced the eleven-song album. The soundtrack included artists such as Adam Lambert, Lil Yachty, Andy Grammer, Weird Al Yankovic on the film's theme song and original score by Theodore Shapiro (Ghostbusters, The Devil Wears Prada, Marley & Me).

MundoNick's Kally's Mashup

In 2017, Anders Media aired its inaugural international program Kally's Mashup on Nickelodeon (Latin America).
Anders serves as Co-Creator, Executive Producer and Executive Soundtrack Producer alongside Nikki Anders and Peer Astrom.
In May 2018, Kally's Mashup was renewed for a second season, following the wide success of the first season.

Monarch
In 2021, Anders joined the Fox country music drama series Monarch as the show's music supervisor and wrote and produced several songs for the first season, which premiered on September 11, 2022.

Awards and nominations

Grammy Awards

|-
|2011
|Glee: The Music, Volume 1
|Best Compilation Soundtrack for Visual Media
|
|-
|2012
|Glee: The Music, Volume 4
|Best Compilation Soundtrack for Visual Media
|
|-
|2013
|Rock of Ages (2012 film) Soundtrack
|Best Compilation Soundtrack for Visual Media
|
|-
|2014
|Cee Lo's Magic Moment (with Cee Lo Green)
|Best Traditional Pop Vocal Album
|
|-

Golden Globe Awards

|-
|2010
|Glee
|Best Musical or Comedy
|
|-
|2011
|Glee
|Best Musical or Comedy
|
|-

ARIA Awards

|-
|2010
|Wrapped Up Good (with The McClymonts)
|Best Country Album
|
|-

People's Choice Awards

|-
|2010
|Glee
|Favorite New TV Comedy
|
|-
|2011
|Glee
|Favorite TV Comedy
|
|-

Filmography

Television

Discography

Feature films

Movies for television

Television

Albums/songs

References

Living people
1975 births
American people of Swedish descent
American record producers
Businesspeople from Stockholm